Yuba-Rayane Yesli (born October 12, 1999) is an Algerian footballer who plays as a goalkeeper for Valour FC in the Canadian Premier League.

Career 
Yesli played youth soccer with CS Dollard, Notre-Dame-de-Grâce SA, and Panellinios St Michel FC. Afterwards, he was part of the Montreal Impact Academy. In January 2018, he joined U.S. Vibonese Calcio in the Italian Serie D, where they won promotion to the Serie C. He re-signed for the 2018-19 season.

In 2019 and 2020, he played with CS Fabrose in the Première Ligue de soccer du Québec, winning the 2019 Coupe PLSQ. He decided to attend the Université de Montréal and play for the Carabins soccer team in 2020, however the playing season was cancelled due to the COVID-19 pandemic.

He was selected third overall by Valour FC of the Canadian Premier League in the 2021 CPL-U Sports Draft, but did not ultimately sign with them for the 2021 season. However, he did serve as the league's emergency goalkeeper during the league's initial season which took place in a bubble, available to all team's on a short-term loan, in case of an injury to a team's goalkeepers as replacements were not available due to the bubble format, although he was not ultimately needed as a replacement. Afterwards, he trained with Major League Soccer club CF Montréal.

He then joined AS Blainville in the PLSQ for the 2021 season. He made his Canadian Championship debut on August 17, 2021 against Canadian Premier League side HFX Wanderers FC in a 2-1 loss.

In January 2022, he signed with Valour FC for the 2022 season. He made his debut for the club on May 11 in a Canadian Championship match against MLS club Vancouver Whitecaps FC. He made his league debut on June 1 in a 1-0 loss to Atlético Ottawa. He earned his first victory and clean sheet on August 3, in his second league start, in a 2-0 victory over Cavalry FC. In January 2023, he joined French Ligue 1 club AC Ajaccio for a training stint, first joining the reserves, before joining the first team for training.

Personal
Born in Algeria, Yesli moved to Canada at a young age and holds dual Algerian and Canadian nationality.

Career statistics

References

External links

Living people
1999 births
Association football goalkeepers
Algerian footballers
Valour FC draft picks
Première ligue de soccer du Québec players
CF Montréal players
U.S. Vibonese Calcio players
A.S. Blainville players
FC Laval players
Valour FC players